Elliott Yamin is the debut album by American pop singer Elliott Yamin, released on March 20, 2007, by the independent label Hickory Records and distributed through Sony BMG–owned RED Distribution. Yamin, an American Idol finalist, collaborated with Sony/ATV Music Publishing to write, produce, and market the record. The album includes 11 tracks, although several bonus tracks are offered at different retailers.

Elliott Yamin debuted at number 3 on the Billboard 200 and spawned three singles (one promotional and two official): "Movin' On", "Wait for You" and "One Word". It was certified gold by the Recording Industry Association of America in the United States. To promote the record, Yamin went on a world tour across North America and Southeast Asia that consisted of clubs, small theatres and radio-station holiday shows.

On Billboards end of decade charts, the album placed at number 39 on the top independent albums of the decade list.

Background and development
Yamin commented on the album:

Yamin described his CD as "a vocally driven mix of R&B/pop crossover material with hints of blues and a few club-bangers."

Promotion
Previews of four songs were made available on AOL Music First Listen on February 13, 2007: pre-album promo single "Movin' On", a full version of his acclaimed cover of "A Song for You", a love song titled "You are the One", and "Find a Way". The radio premiere of the first official single, "Wait for You", was on March 1, 2007, on KIIS-FM. The song was released to online music services, including iTunes, on March 13, 2007. Yamin promoted the album during 2007 with a nine-month tour of clubs, small theaters and radio-station holiday shows across the United States, plus shows in Canada, the Philippines, and Malaysia.

The album was released in Japan on May 21, 2008, by Avex Trax. This version was retitled Wait for You and includes "In Love with You Forever" and "Believe" as bonus tracks. It was certified Gold there in September 2008. On October 8, 2008, a Premium Edition of the album was released in Japan, including 2 more tracks: "A Whiter Shade of Pale" and "I'll Make You Dance", plus Yamin's cover of "Home", originally by Japanese singer Yusaku Kiyama, who recorded a Japanese version of "Wait for You" in return.

Critical reception

Daniel Wolfe of About.com praised both the genre variety on the record's track list and Yamin's vocal talents over them, saying that, "Whether it is his transcendent vocal on the choir-backed "Free" or his show-stopping cover of Leon Russel's "A Song For You," Elliott Yamin proves on his debut album that he is one of the most talented recording artists American Idol has produced." In a dual review with Paris Bennett's Princess P, Vibe writer Sean Fennessey noted how Yamin maintains his vocal identity when performing traditional tracks ("A Song for You") and the album's more "vibrant and modern" material ("Wait for You" and "Movin' On"). Entertainment Weeklys Dave Karger described how to approach the record: "To get the most out of Elliott Yamin, the debut CD from last season's scruffily soulful third-place finisher on American Idol, treat each track like a different episode of the show. "Wait for You" is ballad week: "You did your thing, dawg," Randy might say. "Alright" is hip-hop week: "It sounded like last call at some ghastly karaoke bar" would be Simon's reply. And "A Song for You," the Leon Russell/Donny Hathaway classic Yamin performed at his first Idol audition, is standards week: Cut to Paula, in tears." AllMusic's Stephen Thomas Erlewine was mixed about the album, noting how the tracks can be hit or miss at times with either misplaced styles or manufactured production but gave praise to Yamin's performance for having enough personality to sell the lyrics, saying that "He still sounds effortless and charming, which is why it's a shame he doesn't have the support he would have had if had won Idol: he would have had the biggest budget and the best collaborators, something that would help him make a record as distinctive as he is." Elysa Gardner of USA Today found the album to be a typical Idol release with adequate but generic tracks that are competently performed by Yamin's technically sound delivery, saying that "To his credit, he apes Stevie Wonder and Donny Hathaway as adroitly as Taylor Hicks does Michael McDonald. If that passes for interpretive singing these days, we have Idol, and ourselves, to blame."

Commercial performance
The album debuted on the US Billboard 200 chart at number three, selling 90,000 copies in its first week. It was certified gold on October 12, 2007. As of March 2010, the album has sold 527,000 copies in the United States.

Track listing

Singles
"Wait for You"
"One Word"
"Movin' On" (Philippines only)

Personnel
Credits adapted from the album's liner notes.

Vocals
 Taj Jackson – background vocals 
 Tony Reyes – background vocals 
 Honey Larochelle – background vocals 

Instrumentation

 Josh Abraham – guitar 
 Raymond Angry – piano 
 Rob Bacon – guitar 
 Steve Baxter – trombone 
 Dave Borla – drums 
 Derek Bramble – bass, keyboards 
 Derrick Edmondson – saxophone 
 Josh Freese – drums 
 Oliver Goldstein – piano, acoustic guitar, bass 

 Caesar Griffin – drums 
 Michael Hunter – trumpet 
 Espen Lind – guitar 
 John McCurry – guitar 
 Tony Reyes – guitar , keyboards 
 Ely "The Creep" Rise – keyboards, strings, synth 
 Miguel Rivera – tambourine 
 Ryan Williams – guitar 
 Amy Wood – drums 

Production
 Kari Egsieker – mixing , engineering 
 Jason Goldstein – mixing 
 Colin Miller – mixing 
 Phil Tan – mixing 
 Ryan Williams – mixing , engineering 
 Howie Beno – engineering 
 Josh Houghkirk – assistant engineer 
 Micah Laughlin – assistant engineer 
 Marcus Samperio – assistant engineer 
 Tom Coyne – mastering 
 Chris Gehringer – mastering 

Imagery
 Nick Spanos – photography
 Brian Porizek – art direction and design

Charts

Weekly charts

Year-end charts

Certifications

References

2007 debut albums
Elliott Yamin albums
Avex Group albums
Hickory Records albums
Albums produced by Stargate
Albums recorded at Chung King Studios